Chris Baldwin  is a British performance director and curator, professor and writer, he has lived in northern Spain for 20 years. He develops site specific performances and curated events devoted to specific city, rural or regional contexts. Baldwin's work emphasises the importance of a collaboration between professionals and citizens in the making and curating of cultural projects. He has various plays and Books published about theatre and the teaching of history in post authoritarian countries. Baldwin directs widely including Spain, UK, Poland, Bulgaria and Germany. Baldwin worked for Rose Bruford College, 2012 Summer Olympics. He was Curator of Interdisciplinary Performance for the 2016 European Capital of Culture in Wroclaw, Poland and also works for the Universidad de Santander. He was Creative Director for Galway 2020 European Capital of Culture., the Director of the Contemporary Myth of Kaunas Trilogy for Kaunas European Capital of Culture 2022 and is the director of the Opening Ceremony Mystery 0, Mysteries of Transition of European Capital of Culture, Greece - 2023Eleusis

Major productions (2006–2023) 
 2022/2023 Director Opening Ceremony 2023 Eleusis - European Captial of Culture 2023
 2020/2022 Artistic director Grand events Kaunas European Capital of Culture 2022
 2019/2020 Director Pageant of the seas - Il Mappa - Valletta, Malta
 2017/18 Creative director for Galway 2020 European Capital of Culture.
 2015/16 The Flow Quartet – Wroclaw, European Capital of Culture, 2016. 
 Four performance projects which when combined tell the story of Wroclaw to itself, Poland, Europe and beyond. The Flow Quartet consists of four interlinked projects:
 Bridges – Mosty – 20 June 2015, 
 Spirits of Wroclaw (Opening Ceremony) – 17 January 2016, 
 Flow I and II – 11 June 2016, and 
 Niebo (Closing Ceremony) – 16/17 December 2016
 2012 "Raise the Sky" – Written and directed by Chris Baldwin, Music by Nick Bicat –  London Olympic's Torch Ceremony – Worcester 2012
 2011 "The Way the Winds Blow" – Written and directed by Chris Baldwin, Music by Nick Bicat – Rutland Water June 
 2010 "El tren que nunca fue..." (The Train that never was...) Calera y Chozas, Toledo, Spain 
 2009 "Mapping Bulgaria" – North-West Bulgaria 2009 A regional programme of cultural interventions with young people and history teachers focusing upon arts, social trama and historical memory.
 2008 "The Devil's Tale" – Stourport Basins (British Waterways), UK
 2007 "Epos" – A three-year project of performance research, cultural animation, symposium and festival concluding in a major performance and festival at Contrebia Leukade, La Rioja, Spain
 2007 "Sorgiñak" – A 3-year performance collaboration between artists and local people in rural Aláva, La Rioja, Spain.
 2006 "Suko" – Performance and Design transformation of interior and exterior of Teruel Museum by artists and children (Spain)

Publications 
 Baldwin C, Pinocho (Play Text) Editorial: ÑAQUE  Date:2001
 Baldwin, C Cosima'''Play Text) Editorial: ÑAQUE  Date: 1998
 Baldwin C, Bicat, T. (2002) Teatro de Creación Editorial: Ñaque 
 Baldwin C, Bicat, T. (2002) Devised and Collaborative Theatre Editorial: Crowood  
 Baldwin C, (2003) Stage Directing (Editorial: Crowood )
 Baldwin C (2010) 1989, Mapping the North West of Bulgaria – Applied Theatre and the Teaching of Disputed Histories (Editorial: New Culture Foundation, Bulgaria )

 Press 
 The Soul of the City – Chris Baldwin interviewed by Catherine Trzeciak 12 July 2015 "The City is a story, but it also can be the author of the story. The diverse and multi-layered nature of the city is a story that demands to be told."
 Fiesta in Breslau – Chris Baldwin interviewed by Magda Piekarska 5 December 2015 
 ¨Caos, Dirreción y Amor¨ Chris Baldwin por Bienvenida Borrás 24/04/06

 References 

 Further reading 
 Baldwin C, Bicat, T. (2002)Teatro de Creación Editorial: Ñaque  and Baldwin C, (2003) Stage Directing'' (Editorial: Crowood )
 The Soul of the city – Chris Baldwin interviewed by Catherine Trzeciak 12 July 2015 "The City is a story, but it also can be the author of the story. The diverse and multi-layered nature of the city is a story that demands to be told."
 Fiesta in Breslau – Chris Baldwin interviewed by Magda Piekarska 5 December 2015

External links 
 Chris Baldwin official site
 Galway European Capital of Culture 2020
 Wroclaw European Capital of Culture 2016 
 Radio Interview Dying Villages
 Theatre Futures 
 Teatro de Creacion
 https://www.tygodnikpowszechny.pl/dusza-miasta-31566
 ¨Caos, Dirreción y Amor¨ Chris Baldwin por Bienvenida Borrás 24/04/06 http://www.diagonalperiodico.net/culturas/caos-direccion-y-amor-son-tres-ejes-sobre-pivota-trabajo-creativo.html
 http://wyborcza.pl/magazyn/1,149724,19296289,fiesta-w-breslau-rozmowa-z-kuratorem-europejskiej-stolicy-kultury.html
 https://www.diariodelaltoaragon.es/NoticiasDetalle.aspx?Id=956211

British theatre directors
British curators
Living people
Year of birth missing (living people)